The Kenworth W900 is a model line of conventional-cab trucks that are produced by the Kenworth division of PACCAR. The replacement of the 900-series conventional, the W900 is produced as a Class 8 conventional-cab truck primarily for highway use. The "W" in its model designation denotes Worthington, one of the two founders of Kenworth.

At its introduction, the W900 conventional was introduced alongside the K100 COE.  As the Kenworth model line was expanded, the W900 became its flagship conventional, with its cab structure used across other model families; the model line competed against a wide variety of model lines through its production.  In line with the Peterbilt 379 (from PACCAR sister division Peterbilt), the W900 gained a following among owner-operator drivers. The model line also became a popular basis for truck customization, with owners adding additional chrome trim, wheels, lighting, and paint. Introduced in 2018, the Kenworth W990 was developed to complement the W900 line. The W900 is manufactured at Kenworth's main manufacturing facilities in Renton, Washington and Chillicothe, Ohio.

Background 
In 1956, Kenworth introduced the 900-series conventional-cab truck, replacing the 500-series introduced in 1939.  As with its predecessor, the 900-series shared the chassis of the Kenworth cabover, replacing the "Bullnose" Kenworth COE with the Kenworth K100.  As before, a side-opening "butterfly" hood was standard, but a forward tilting fiberglass hood became an option for the first time.

In 1961, Kenworth introduced the W900 conventional as the replacement for the 900-series.  As part of several major design changes, the cab was completely redesigned, raising the height of the cab roof and windows and mounting the two windshield panes together.  To better allow for engine cooling, the radiator was widened slightly, with the tilting hood made standard.  While the headlights remained fender-mounted, the housings were faired into the fenders.

Model overview 
For 60 years, Kenworth produced three basic versions of the W900 model family.  The "narrow-hood" W900 was produced from 1961 to 1966 and the "wide hood" W900A was produced from 1967 to 1982.  From 1982 to 2020, Kenworth produced the W900B (later dropping the "B").  Alongside the standard W900B, an extended-hood W900L was introduced in 1989. The sloped-hood W900S was introduced in 1987; the W900S is similar to the T800, except for its set-forward front axle.

W900 (1961-1964) 
In contrast to the 900-series and 500-series Kenworth conventionals, the cab introduced "bulkhead-style" doors (with full-length hinges).  In another change, the roof panel was changed from metal to fiberglass.  While functionally different, the W900 retained the wide-style vent windows, with door handles mounted below the windows.

W900A (1965-1982) 
In 1965, the W900 underwent its first major change and was renamed the W900A.  To accommodate larger diesel engines, the long hood was lengthened several inches to further increase radiator size.  For 1972, the doors of the W900 were changed, with the model adapting larger windows, and correspondingly narrower vent windows; for ease of use, the door handles were re-positioned to the bottom of the doors and changed from a lever-style to a pull-style configuration.  In 1973, the Kenworth badging was changed, with a redesigned grille emblem and hood badging.  In 1974, a 60-inch flattop double sleeper was introduced as a factory option.

In 1976, Kenworth introduced the Aerodyne sleeper cab for the W900A.  Distinguished by its twin skylight windows, Aerodyne was the first factory-produced sleeper cab with a raised roof.

After the 1982 introduction of the W900B, the W900 continued production in Mexico (Kenmex), adopting the latter model's rectangular headlamps.

W900B (1982-present) 
During 1982, Kenworth introduced the W900B as a replacement for the W900A.  While largely distinguished by its introduction of rectangular headlamps (though round headlamps initially remained an option), the W900B was significantly changed. To further accommodate increased engine cooling, the hoodline was raised, requiring the cab to be mounted higher on the frame. New modular electrical components were introduced, a completely new cab and sleepers, new frame, and many other features replaced or updated features from the A model.

Since the introduction of the W900B, Kenworth has introduced two variants of the W900.  In 1987, the W900S was introduced, adopting the sloped hood of the T800.  In 1990, the W900L was introduced as a longer version, extending the BBC from 120 to 130 inches.  Initially produced as a limited edition (to commemorate the W900B model's appearance in Licence to Kill), the W900L went from becoming a limited edition to a full production vehicle.  From the 1990s onward, the W900L would become one of the most popular vehicles sold by Kenworth.

Since the introduction of the W900S and W900L, along with changes to the powertrain to comply with upgraded emissions standards, several functional changes have been made to the W900B.  In late 1994, the Aerocab/Aerodyne2 became an option for the W900B and W900L; also shared with the T600B. The Aerocab featured a raised roof and a full-width curved windscreen (in one-piece or two-piece configurations); on standard-configuration day cabs, the two-piece flat windshield remains available. On day-cab configurations, the Aerocab roof design introduced an extended-BBC configuration.  In 1998, the 86-inch Studio Sleeper was introduced as an option, easily one of the largest factory-produced sleeper cabs ever produced.  In 2006, the curved windshield became available on the W900S for the first time. The W900S has since been discontinued. B-cab models still in production for 2021 are the W900B, W900L, T800, and C500 (Brute).

W990 (2018-present) 
In December 2018 Kenworth released a newer version of the W900, the W990. A combination of the T680/T880 and the W900, it offers Complex Reflector headlamps and a more aerodynamic front fascia than the W900, while the interior remains as before. The instrument cluster is also from the newer generation of Kenworths. This was thought to be the replacement of W900, but as drivers did not like it the W900 was not discontinued.

Engines 
12.8 litre Paccar MX13

14.9 litre Cummins X15(Efficiency/Performance)

1998-2020 sleeper configurations 

 86 in Aerocab Aerodyne Studio Sleeper (218.44 cm)
 72 in Aerocab Flattop or Aerodyne (182.88 cm)
 62 in Aerocab Flattop or Aerodyne (157.48 cm)
 38 in Aerocab Flattop Sleeper (91.44 cm)
 42 in Modular Flat-top (106.68 cm) Special Order on W900 and C500 models

Variants 
Structurally, the W900 shares commonality with a wide variety of Kenworth trucks produced in North America through a wide variety of applications.

K100 (1961-2004) 
In 1961, Kenworth introduced the K100 cabover model line alongside the W900 conventional ("K" standing for Kent, the first half of Kenworth). While using a different frame and cab, the K100 models shared similar build characteristics with the W900s and other models, such as free-fit bolted frames, and bulkhead doors with piano-style hinges.

As length restriction regulations were liberalized in North America in the early 1980s, the demand for cabover-style semitractors fell sharply, with the K100E ending production in 2004.  After its discontinuation in the North America, the K100 remained in production in Australia until 2011, when it was replaced by the K200. While structurally similar to the K100, the Kenworth K200 features a redesigned interior and exterior.

C500 (1972-present) 
Introduced in 1972, the Kenworth C500 is marketed nearly exclusively in severe-service configurations.  Sharing its cab with the W900, the C500 uses a model-specific chassis, offered with multiple axle configurations (including versions with twin steer axles).

T600 (1985-2007) 
Introduced for 1985, the Kenworth T600 is the first aerodynamically-enhanced semitractor, with a sloped hood, skirted lower body, and bodywork that closely integrates the front fenders and bumper.  Sharing the cab and frame of the W900, the T600 differs largely with its radically sloped hood, set-back front axle, and air cleaners set under the hood.  Although marketed alongside the W900 for its entire production run, the T600 was not developed as its successor; during the development of the T600, Kenworth achieved over 20% better fuel economy (compared to the W900).

Following the introduction of the T600, Kenworth would debut a wide variety of sloped-hood trucks based on the T600 and W900, including the T400 regional tractor, T800 heavy-duty truck (which currently remains in production), along with medium duty trucks (the T300, followed by the T170/T270/T370/T470).  While featuring changes to its front bodywork, suspension, and frame, the 2008-2017 Kenworth T660, which replaced the T600, shares cab/sleeper commonality with its predecessor and the W900.

Through the late 1980s and 1990s, as a response to the success of the Kenworth T600, other North American truck manufacturers would introduce aerodynamically enhanced semitractors of their own, with the Ford Aeromax, International 9400, and Peterbilt 377 conventionals entering production along with the Peterbilt 372 and Freightliner Argosy cabovers.

Editions

VIT (1976) 
In 1976, to commemorate the American Bicentennial, Kenworth introduced a "V.I.T" limited edition (Very Important Trucker) for the W900 and K100.  Each model line was produced with 50 VIT vehicles, with each named for a different U.S. state.

One of the first Kenworth vehicles fitted with a stand-up Aerodyne sleeper cab (allowing for double beds and clothes closets), the interior was fitted with nearly every available option available on a Kenworth, including refrigerators and hot plates.

While the 1976 VIT is a limited edition vehicle, the VIT name remains in use by Kenworth to denote its highest-trim interior configurations.

007 Limited Edition (1989) 
In 1989, a W900B appeared in the James Bond movie Licence to Kill.  To showcase its appearance, Kenworth produced a "007 Limited Edition" option package for the W900B.  Adopting the same paint livery as the W900B from the movie, the option package was available for any version of the W900B, marking the introduction of the "Extended Hood" option.

Along with the specific livery, the option package featured several distinctive features, including gold-plated Kenworth badging, and James Bond "007" emblems.  The interior featured a number of electronics features, including a TV/VCR combination, cassette player, CD player (with CDs including soundtracks from James Bond movies), and an 8-speaker, 300-watt sound system.

Coinciding with the 007 Limited Edition, the Extended Hood option was offered to all versions of the W900B, becoming the 130-inch BBC W900L.

ICON900 (2015) 
On the 25th anniversary of the W900L a limited edition model was released: the ICON900.  This model is available in limited production numbers and comes with nearly the entire catalog of chrome "brightwork" as well as unique badges to distinguish itself from the standard W900L.

In popular culture 
Through its half-century of production, the Kenworth W900 and its many variants have appeared numerous times on film and television.  One of the most famous appearances of the model line is in the 1977 film Smokey and the Bandit (alongside the Pontiac Trans Am). Of the three W900s, driven by Jerry Reed, one example is a 1973; two are from 1974.  The W900L effectively made its debut in the 1989 James Bond film License to Kill; initially offered as a limited edition commemorating the film, the extended-length configuration became a full-scale production option. Several W990s, along with some T680s, are seen in the 2021 movie “The Ice Road”. 

In television, the W900 was centrally featured in a number of appearances.  Claude Akins appeared in a two-tone green 1974 W900A in the series Movin' On.  The W900 also appeared in the French educational television program C'est pas sorcier.

References

Further reading
 W900 stats

External links

 Kenworth website

W900
Class 8 trucks
Vehicles introduced in 1961
Tractor units